Dominique Rüegg (born 5 February 1996) is a Swiss ice hockey player for ZSC Lions and the Swiss national team.

She participated at the 2015 IIHF Women's World Championship.

References

External links

1996 births
Living people
Swiss women's ice hockey forwards
Olympic ice hockey players of Switzerland
Ice hockey players at the 2018 Winter Olympics
Ice hockey players at the 2022 Winter Olympics
Leksands IF players